Jean-Pierre Dikongué Pipa (born 1940) is a Cameroonian film director and writer. He produced Cameroon's first full-length feature film, Muna Moto, in 1975. Dikongué Pipa's films deal with the interrelationships between elements of traditional Cameroonian culture and the wider world.

Filmography

Notes

References
 DeLancey, Mark W., and Mark Dike DeLancey (2000): Historical Dictionary of the Republic of Cameroon (3rd ed.). Lanham, Maryland: The Scarecrow Press.
 Mbaku, John Mukum (2005). Culture and Customs of Cameroon. Westport, Connecticut: Greenwood Press.
 West, Ben (2004). Cameroon: The Bradt Travel Guide. Guilford, Connecticut: The Globe Pequot Press Inc.

External links
 
 Jean-Pierre Dikongué Pipa at the Marfilmes.

1940 births
Cameroonian film directors
Cameroonian male writers
Living people